Bockelwitz is a former municipality in the district of Mittelsachsen, in Saxony, Germany. With effect from 1 January 2012, it has been incorporated into the town of Leisnig.

References 

Former municipalities in Saxony
Mittelsachsen